Group 3 of the 2017 UEFA European Under-21 Championship qualifying competition consisted of six teams: France, Ukraine, Scotland, Iceland, Macedonia, and Northern Ireland. The composition of the nine groups in the qualifying group stage was decided by the draw held on 5 February 2015.

The group was played in home-and-away round-robin format. The group winners qualified directly for the final tournament, while the runners-up advanced to the play-offs if they were one of the four best runners-up among all nine groups (not counting results against the sixth-placed team).

Standings

Matches
Times are CEST (UTC+2) for dates between 29 March and 24 October 2015 and between 27 March and 29 October 2016, for other dates times are CET (UTC+1).

Goalscorers
4 goals

 Kire Markoski
 Artem Besyedin

3 goals

 Sébastien Haller
 Corentin Tolisso
 Elías Már Ómarsson
 Marjan Radeski
 Jason Cummings
 Andriy Boryachuk

2 goals

 Jean-Kévin Augustin
 Höskuldur Gunnlaugsson
 Oliver Sigurjónsson
 Aron Elís Þrándarson
 Viktor Angelov
 Shay McCartan
 Viktor Kovalenko

1 goal

 Enzo Crivelli
 Moussa Dembélé 
 Grejohn Kyei
 Aymeric Laporte
 Thomas Lemar
 Georges-Kévin Nkoudou
 Adrien Rabiot
 Heiðar Ægisson
 Daníel Leó Grétarsson
 Hjörtur Hermannsson
 Árni Vilhjálmsson
 David Babunski
 Enis Bardhi
 Besir Demiri
 Josh Doherty
 Ryan Johnson
 Mikhail Kennedy
 Paul Smyth
 Ryan Christie
 Ryan Fraser
 Billy King
 Oli McBurnie
 Callum Paterson
 Andriy Bliznichenko
 Dmytro Khlyobas
 Oleksandr Svatok
 Yuriy Vakulko
 Oleksandr Zubkov

1 own goal

 Egzon Bejtulai (against France)
 Josh Doherty (against Macedonia)
 Stephen Kingsley (against France)

References

External links
Standings and fixtures at UEFA.com

Group 3